Aurélien Boisvert (1927 – 3 May 2021) was a Canadian historian and lawyer. He attended classical college in Terrebonne and subsequently studied law at the Université de Montréal. Following his law career, he published several books on New France.

Books
Aperçu des mœurs et coutumes des Agniers au xviie siècle (1991)
Histoire du Montréal, 1640-1672 (1992)
Une vallée de la mort attendait les Français
Prisonniers des Agniers (1994)
Nation iroquoise (1996)
Voyage chez les Onnontagués (1998)
Monsieur Duplessis a-t-il eu la tête de Mgr Charbonneau ? (1999)
Dollard, ses compagnons et ses alliés (2005)

Honors
 (2006)

References

1927 births
2021 deaths
French Quebecers
20th-century Canadian historians
20th-century Canadian lawyers
Université de Montréal alumni